British Nigerians are British people of Nigerian descent or Nigerians of British descent.

This article is about residents and citizens of Nigerian descent living in Britain. Many Nigerians and their British-born descendants in Britain live in South London. They are one of the larger immigrant groups in the country.

History 
Nigerians have formed long-established communities in London, Liverpool and other industrial cities. The earliest known Nigerian presence in London took place over 200 years ago as a direct result of the transatlantic slave trade. Olaudah Equiano, born in what is now Nigeria and a former slave, lived in London and was involved in the debate that occurred in Britain over the abolition of the slave trade.

Like many other former British colonies, Nigeria has been a large source of immigrants to the United Kingdom. Prior to Nigerian independence from Britain, gained in 1960, many Nigerians studied in the UK along with other countries such as Australia and the United States; with the majority returning to Nigeria upon completion of their higher education. In the 1960s, civil and political unrest in Nigeria contributed to many refugees migrating to Britain, along with skilled workers.

Nigerians emigrated in larger numbers in the 1980s, following the collapse of the petroleum boom. This wave of migration has been more permanent than the pre-independence wave of temporary migration. Asylum applications from Nigerians peaked in 1995, when the repression associated with the military dictatorship of Sani Abacha was at its height.

In 2015, Britain's Independent Anti-slavery Commissioner expressed concerns about the extent of contemporary slavery involving Nigerians smuggled to the UK. Of more than 2,000 potential victims of human trafficking referred to the National Crime Agency in 2014, 244 were from Nigeria. This represented a 31 per cent increase on 2013's figure. According to the BBC, "Campaigners believe the real figure of potential trafficking victims from Nigeria could be much higher".

Demographics

Population

The 2001 UK Census recorded 88,378 Nigerian-born people resident in the UK. The 2011 Census recorded 191,183 Nigerian-born residents in England and Wales. The censuses of Scotland and Northern Ireland recorded 9,458 and 543 Nigerian-born residents respectively. More recent estimates by the Office for National Statistics put the figure at 215,000 in 2019.

A Council of Europe report gives a figure of 100,000 Nigerians in the UK but suggests that this is likely to be an underestimate since it does not include irregular migrants or children born outside of Nigeria. Similarly, Nigerians with citizenship of another EU member state who then relocated to the UK are not necessarily included in this estimate. The report suggests to multiply the figure by between 3 and 8 to reflect the size of the Nigerian community in the UK.

Distribution
The UK's largest concentration of Nigerians is found in the capital city, London. Peckham is now home to the largest overseas Nigerian community in the UK, with 7% of the population of the Peckham census tract at the time of the 2001 UK Census having been born in Nigeria. Many of the local establishments are Yoruba and Igbo owned. Nigerian churches and mosques can be found in the area. As immigrants have become assimilated, English has always been the predominant language of the local Nigerian British population as English is the main spoken language in Nigeria. The Yoruba language and the Igbo language are declining in use in the Peckham area despite the growing Nigerian population of Igbo and Yoruba descent. Outside London and South East England, the largest Nigerian-born communities are found in the East of England and the North West.

Citizenship
Below is a table showing how many Nigerians were granted British citizenship and the right of abode in the period 1998 to 2008.

Language
In England and Wales in 2011, 14,914 people (0.03% of all residents aged three and over) spoke Yoruba as a main language, 7,946 (0.01%) spoke Igbo and 6,639 (0.01%) spoke other Nigerian languages. In London, 10,119 people (0.13% of all residents aged three and over) spoke Yoruba as a main language, 5,252 (0.07%) people spoke Igbo and 3,577 (0.05%) spoke other Nigerian languages.

Education
According to the Institute for Public Policy Research, Nigerian pupils are among best performing student groups in the United Kingdom. Taking data for only England, a 2013 IPPR survey reported that the proportion of British Nigerian pupils gaining 5 A*–C grades at GCSE (including Maths and English) in 2010–2011 was 21.8 percentage points higher than the England mean of 59.6 per cent. This average was calculated using student data, where available, from various local authorities in England.

The number of Nigerian pupils at British private schools is growing. In November 2013, The Spectator noted that Nigerians, along with Russians, "are now the fastest-growing population in British private schools". In 2013, the number of entrants to private schools from Nigeria increased by 16 per cent.

According to Higher Education Statistics Agency data, 17,620 students from Nigeria were studying at British public higher education institutions in the academic year 2011–12. This made them the third largest country-of-origin group behind students from China and India. Of the 17,620, 6,500 were undergraduates, 9,620 taught postgraduates and 1,500 research postgraduates.

Research by Euromonitor International for the British Council indicates that in 2010, the majority (66 per cent) of Nigerian foreign students attended universities in the UK. The students are mainly drawn to these institutions' English language academic system. Their time studying in Britain is also facilitated by an established and large Nigerian community and by "the relative proximity of the UK to Nigeria".

Notable British Nigerians

Nigerian citizens of British descent
Caroline Danjuma, actress
Eku Edewor, actress
Lola Maja, makeup artist
Nicholas Mostyn, judge
SHiiKANE, girl group
Remi Vaughan-Richards, filmmaker

British citizens of Nigerian descent
Shola Mos-Shogbamimu, Lawyer & academic, notable as an activist and political commentator
Dupsy Abiola, entrepreneur
Faridah Àbíké-Íyímídé, writer
Dotun Adebayo, journalist and presenter
Victor, Lord Adebowale, peer
Adelayo Adedayo, actress
Abu-Abdullah Adelabu, cleric, scholar and publisher
Eniola Aluko, footballer
Tolu Akinyemi (Poetolu), writer
Julie Adenuga, radio presenter and host
Abimbola Afolami, MP
Kriss Akabusi, athlete
Adewale Akinnuoye-Agbaje, actor
Dele Alli, footballer
John Amaechi, basketball player and psychologist
Dame Elizabeth Anionwu, nurse and professor of nursing 
OG Anunoby, basketball player
Matthew Ashimolowo, clergyman
Richard Ayoade, actor and comedian of Norwegian and Nigerian descent
Kemi Badenoch, MP
Tunde Baiyewu, singer
Dame Shirley Bassey, singer
Sara Forbes Bonetta, Yoruba princess, goddaughter to Queen Victoria
John Boyega, actor
Tosin Cole, actor
Taio Cruz, singer
Dave, rapper
Victoria Davies Randle, Yoruba princess, goddaughter to Queen Victoria 
Dizzee Rascal, grime artist
Ugo Ehiogu, footballer
Chiwetel Ejiofor, actor
Carmen Ejogo, actress
Buchi Emecheta, author
Olaudah Equiano, explorer, writer, merchant and abolitionist
Florence Eshalomi, MP
Bernardine Evaristo, author and Booker Prize winner
John Fashanu, footballer
Justin Fashanu, footballer
Keji Giwa, entrepreneur
Helen Grant, MP
Vick Hope, television and radio presenter
AJ Odudu, television and radio presenter
Anne-Marie Imafidon, child prodigy
Maro Itoje, rugby union player
Alex Iwobi, footballer
NneNne Iwuji-Eme, Britain's first black female ambassador
JME, grime artist
Hannah John-Kamen, actor of Norwegian and Nigerian descent
Anthony Joshua, professional boxer
Joe Joyce, professional boxer
Cush Jumbo, actress, writer
Hakeem Kae-Kazim, actor
Eman Kellam, television presenter and actor
KSI, YouTube personality, rapper and professional boxer
Lemar, singer
Archie Madekwe, actor
Ugo Monye, rugby player
Victor Moses, footballer 
Mikel John Obi, footballer
Esther Odekunle, neurobiologist and antibody engineer
Chris Ofili, artist
Michelle Ogundehin, television presenter
Adebayo Ogunlesi, investment banker
Christine Ohuruogu, athlete
Femi Oke, journalist
Kele Okereke, musician
Lawrence Okolie, professional boxer
Sophie Okonedo, actress
Sir Ken Olisa, investment banker and businessman
Eunice Olumide, broadcaster, actress, supermodel 
David Olusoga, historian
Fiona Onasanya, MP
Chi Onwurah, MP
Kate Osamor, MP 
Martha, Baroness Osamor, peer
David Oyelowo, actor
Abiodun Oyepitan, athlete
Helen Oyeyemi, writer
Annie Yellowe Palma, author
Hal Robson-Kanu, footballer
Sade, singer
Bukayo Saka, footballer
Seal, singer
Yinka Shonibare, artist
Skepta, grime artist
Damilola Taylor, murder victim
Tinie Tempah, grime artist
Daley Thompson, Olympian
Chuka Umunna, MP
Reece Wabara, footballer and businessman
Beno Obano, rugby player
Sope Dirisu, actor
Chuku Modu, actor
Michael Olise, footballer
Eberechi Eze, footballer
Femi Azeez, footballer
Miguel Azeez, footballer
Adebayo Akinfenwa, footballer
 Alim Abubakre, lecturer

See also

 Nigerian Australian
 Nigerians in Ireland
 Black British people

References

External links
 Central Association of Nigerians in the UK (CAN-UK)

 
African diaspora in the United Kingdom
Nigerian diaspora
 
Nigeria